The Women's team foil event of the 2013 World Fencing Championships was held on August 10, 2013.

Medalists

Draw

Finals

Top half

Bottom half

Placement rounds

5–8th place

9–16th place

13–16th place

Final classification

External links

 Bracket
 Bracket 1–8
 Bracket 3–4
 Bracket 5–8
 Bracket 7–8
 Bracket 9–16
 Bracket 11–12
 Bracket 13–16
 Bracket 15–16

2013 World Fencing Championships
World